is a Japanese rock band, often called Delico for short. They are popular not only in Japan but also Hong Kong and Taiwan.

Members 
 Kumi (Born April 11, 1976, in Chiba Prefecture) – lead vocals, guitars, etc.
 Kumi speaks English because she lived in San Francisco, the United States, in her youth. She got married on March 9, 2010.
 Naoki (Born July 21, 1973, in Shizuoka Prefecture) – guitars, bass, backing vocals, etc.
 Naoki wrote his name in their early works as "Naoki Sato". He produces The Bawdies.

Backup band
 Hirohisa Horie (Neil & Iraiza): keyboards, guitar
 Kiyoshi Takakuwa (ex-Great3): bass
 Kenichi Shirane (Great3): drums
 Nobumasa Yamada (amp'box Recording studio): recording engineer, drums
 Tomohiko Gondo: programming

History 

The band was formed in January 1997 by singer Kumi and guitarist Naoki Sato, while studying at Aoyama Gakuin University in Tokyo. Only Kumi and Naoki remained finally in the band though it consisted of several members at first.

They signed with major label Victor in 1999.

Their first album, The Greatest Hits, sold over two million copies. Their second album Love Psychedelic Orchestra, was released on January 9, 2001, and went on to sell 690,000 copies.

Love Psychedelico visited America in March 2001 and appeared at the music festival SXSW as part of the Japan Nite event. They also toured extensively through the club and bar circuit in the United States, garnering largely positive reactions. American cities the band has said to have enjoyed playing were Nashville, Austin, and Kumi's childhood home of San Francisco.

They have released two albums since, Love Psychedelico III, in early 2004, and compilation album Early Times, in February 2005. This best-of compilation received a positive response in the Taiwanese J-pop market and the group visited Taiwan in June of that year. They held a concert in Taipei on June 22 where many fans gathered, including a sizable number of celebrity attendees. It proved to be a very successful concert for the duo who do not usually appear publicly.

For the promotion of their album, Golden Grapefruit, Love Psychedelico made their first televised music program appearance on Bokura no Ongaku in 2007. It is also notable that they were interviewed by Yoko Ono, famous experimental musician and widow of John Lennon.

They released the album This is Love Psychedelico in the United States on May 20 from HackTone Records because David Gorman, the president of the label, wanted a contract with them after listening to a record he got from an acquaintance. It marked their American debut. This album was also released on June 18, 2008 in Japan as This is Love Psychedelico ~U.S.Best~.

Style
Stylistically, Love Psychedelico is highly reminiscent of the British Invasion of the late 60s, both members having cited The Beatles and Led Zeppelin as influences, though the influence of American folk and blues are also present (Kumi having claimed Janis Joplin and Sheryl Crow, and Sato Bob Dylan, as influences). To pay tribute to their influences, Love Psychedelico sometimes borrow song titles from the bands that influence them.

Kumi's lyrics mix English and Japanese; while doing so is common in popular Japanese music, Kumi's performance is marked by fluent English pronunciation and an English-inflected pronunciation of Japanese, similar to that of many Japanese who have spent significant time abroad.  While she did spend three years in San Francisco from the ages of 2 to 5, her spoken Japanese does not display the same affectations.  This pronunciation makes the group's songs difficult to reproduce in karaoke performances in contrast bands such as Superfly who have a similar stylistic approach but without the English-affected Japanese.

Discography

DVDs
 The Film 1999.12—2002.05 (November 21, 2002)
 In Concert at Budokan (December 7, 2005)
 Golden Grapefruit Box (June 18, 2008)
 LOVE PSYCHEDELICO Live Tour 2017 LOVE YOUR LOVE at THE NAKANO SUN PLAZA (May 9, 2018)

References

Works cited

External links
 Official site
 Love Psychedelico at Musicjapanplus
 Love Psychedelico – The Film DVD Review at cityonfire.com
 Early Times CD Review
 Nippon Project interview

Japanese rock music groups
Japanese musical duos
Musical groups established in 1997
Musical groups from Tokyo